Abu al-Fatḥ Manuchihr Khan (died 1636), was a Safavid official and gholam of Armenian origin. Like his father Qarachaqay Khan, Manuchihr was established at Mashhad as the general and governor of Khorasan under the shahs (kings) Abbas I (r. 1588–1629) and Ṣāfi (r. 1629–1642). His brother Ali Quli Khan became prefect of Qom and head of the library of Abbas I. Manuchihr Khan's son, Qarachaqay Khan II (d. 1668), became also a governor of Mashhad. All of them were among the Safavid cultural and intellectual elite, known as “men of knowledge and integrity’ (ahl-i fazl u kamāl) and “of illustrious acts and deeds” (ṣāhib-i mu'āṣir u asrār).

His works

Manuchihr Khan was a leading art patron, with a strong curiosity and interest in astronomy. He commissioned one of the finest illustrated manuscripts of the period, a Persian translation of 'Abd al-Rahmān ibn 'Umar al-Ṣūfī’s Ṣuwar al-Kawākib al-Thābitah ("the description of the fixed stars"), copied between 1630-1633 and conserved in the New York Public Library collection (Spencer, Pers. Ms. 6), see: Schmitz, 1992, p. 122. 

In 1632–1633, Manuchihr Khan commissioned Hasan ibn Sa‘d al-Qa‘īnī, Master Mālik Husayn Naqqāsh Isfahānī, and Rezvan Beg Zarneshan to produce a celestial globe known later as the Manuchihr Globe.

In 1636, Muhammad Qasim completed an illustrated copy of Vahshi Bafqi's Farhad and Shirin for the library collection of Abu al-Fath Manuchihr Khan. Muhammad Qasim drew four paintings for this particular copy.

References

Sources 

 
 Schmitz 1992, no.123, p. 55 ; Robinson, Sims, Bayani, 2007, p. 19.
 The Manuchihr Globe

1636 deaths
Safavid generals
Ethnic Armenian Shia Muslims
Persian Armenians
Safavid governors of Mashhad
17th-century people of Safavid Iran
Safavid ghilman
Patrons of the arts